Associação Xanxerense de Futebol, commonly known as Xanxerense, is a Brazilian football club based in Xanxerê, Santa Catarina state.

History
The club was founded on May 13, 1978. They finished in the second position in the Campeonato Catarinense Second Level in 1992, losing the competition to Joaçaba.

Stadium
Associação Xanxerense de Futebol play their home games at Estádio Josué Anoni. The stadium has a maximum capacity of 5,000 people.

References

Association football clubs established in 1978
Football clubs in Santa Catarina (state)
1978 establishments in Brazil